The Catholic High School of Baltimore is a private, all-girls, Roman Catholic high school in Baltimore, Maryland.  It is located in the Roman Catholic Archdiocese of Baltimore.

Background
The Catholic High School of Baltimore is a sponsored institution of the Sisters of St. Francis of Philadelphia.

Notable alumnae
 Stacy Keibler '97: Former professional wrestler and 2nd runner-up on Dancing with the Stars, season two
 Gina Schock: Drummer for The Go-Go's

See also

National Catholic Educational Association

Notes and references

External links
 Roman Catholic Archdiocese of Baltimore
 School Website

Catholic secondary schools in Maryland
Private schools in Baltimore
Educational institutions established in 1939
Middle States Commission on Secondary Schools
Girls' schools in Maryland
1939 establishments in Maryland